Manon André (born 22 September 1986) is a French female rugby union player. She represented  at the 2010 Women's Rugby World Cup and has been named in the squad to the 2014 Women's Rugby World Cup

References

1986 births
Living people
People from Muret
French female rugby union players
Sportspeople from Haute-Garonne